Wakestock may refer to:

Wakestock (Canada)
Wakestock (Wales)

See also
 Wakestock 2008, in Wales